Li Xinyi (born 13 March 1998), also known as Rex, is a Chinese singer and songwriter. He was a contestant in the survival program, Produce Camp 2019. His debut single, Dream with Me, was released at the 2019 Opening Ceremony of the 5th Annual Jackie Chan International Action Film Week and charted on Billboard China's Social Music Chart at No. 11.

Early life and education
Li was born on 13 March 1998 in Liaoning, China. He was an avid basketball player until he was introduced to singing. He attends the Beijing Contemporary Music Academy.

Career

2019–present: Produce Camp 2019 and solo debut

In 2019, Li and three other trainees represented SDT Entertainment on Chinese reality boy band show Produce Camp 2019. He placed 13th in the final episode and was eliminated. He did not join the final debuting lineup, R1SE. However, he made his solo debut with the single "Dream with Me" on July 16, 2019. His second single, titled "Walk with You" was released on August 7, 2019. He released his third single, "就让我走", together with the music video on August 26, 2019. Li released his debut EP One, consisting of three songs. He took part in the OST of the television series, 梦回 with the single, "梦她".

Discography

Albums

Singles

Filmography

Television shows

Videography

Music videos

References

External links
 

1998 births
Living people
Chinese television personalities
Chinese male singer-songwriters
Produce 101 (Chinese TV series) contestants
Singers from Liaoning
21st-century Chinese male singers